Sassi Boultif (born 9 January 1983) is an Algerian handball player for Al-Nasr.

He competed for the Algerian national team at the 2015 World Men's Handball Championship in Qatar.

He also participated at the 2009, 2011 and 2013 World Championships.

References

1983 births
Living people
Algerian male handball players
21st-century Algerian people